The New Kingdom of Granada, or Kingdom of the New Granada, was the name given to a group of 16th-century Spanish colonial provinces in northern South America governed by the president of the Royal Audience of Santafé, an area corresponding mainly to modern-day Colombia. The conquistadors originally organized it as a province with a Royal Audience within the Viceroyalty of Peru despite certain independence from it. The  was established by the crown in 1549. Ultimately the kingdom became the Viceroyalty of New Granada first in 1717 and permanently in 1739. After several attempts to set up independent states in the 1810s, the kingdom and the viceroyalty ceased to exist altogether in 1819 with the establishment of the United Provinces of New Granada.

History

Discovery and settlement

In 1514, the Spanish first permanently settled in the area. With Santa Marta (founded on July 29, 1525 by the Spanish conquistador Rodrigo de Bastidas) and Cartagena (1533), Spanish control of the coast was established, and the extension of colonial control into the interior could begin.  Starting in 1536, the conquistador Gonzalo Jiménez de Quesada explored the extensive highlands of the interior of the region, by following the Magdalena River into the Andean cordillera. There his force defeated the powerful Muisca and founding the city of Santa Fé de Bogotá  (Bogotá) and naming the region El nuevo reino de Granada, "the new kingdom of Granada", in honor of the last part of Spain to be recaptured from the Moors, home to the brothers De Quesada. After Gonzalo Jiménez de Quesada left for Spain in May 1539, the reign of the colony was transferred to his brother Hernán. De Quesada, however, lost control of the province when Emperor Charles V granted the right to rule over the area to rival conquistador, Sebastián de Belalcázar, in 1540, who had entered the region from what is today Ecuador, and named himself governor of Popayán.

Regularization of the government 
Charles V ordered the establishment of an audiencia, a type of superior court that combined executive and judicial authority, at Santafé de Bogotá in 1549.

List of governors

Royal Audiencia
The Royal Audiencia was created by a royal decree of July 17, 1549. It was given authority over the provinces of Santa Marta, Río de San Juan, Popayán, Guayana and Cartagena de Indias.  The Audiencia was charged primarily with dispensing justice, but it was also to oversee the running of government and the settlement of the territory. It held its first session on April 7, 1550, in a mansion on the Plaza Mayor (today, Plaza de Bolívar) at the site which today houses the Colombian Palace of Justice.

Law VIII ("Royal Audiencia and Chancery of Santa Fe in the New Kingdom of Granada") of Title XV ("Of the Royal Audiencias and Chanceries of the Indies") of Book II of the Recopilación de Leyes de las Indias of 1680—which compiles the decrees of July 17, 1549; May 10, 1554; and August 1, 1572—describes the final limits and functions of the Audiencia.

In Santa Fé de Bogotá of the New Kingdom of Granada shall reside another Royal Audiencia and Chancery of ours, with a president, governor and captain general; five judges of civil cases [oidores], who shall also be judges of criminal cases [alcaldes del crimen]; a crown attorney [fiscal]; a bailiff [alguacil mayor]; a lieutenant of the Gran Chancellor; and the other necessary ministers and officials, and which will have for district the provinces of the New Kingdom and those of Santa Marta, Río de San Juan, and of Popayán, except those places of the latter which are marked for the Royal Audiencia of Quito; and of Guayana, or El Dorado, it shall have that which is not of the Audienicia of Hispaniola, and all of the Province of Cartagena; sharing borders: on the south with said Audiencia of Quito and the undiscovered lands, on the west and north with the North Sea and the provinces which belong to the Royal Audiencia of Hispaniola, on the west with the one of Tierra Firme. And we order that the Governor and Captain General of said provinces and president of their Royal Audiencia, have, use and exercise by himself the government of all the district of that Audiencia, in the same manner as our Viceroys of New Spain and appoint the repartimiento of Indians and other offices that need to be appointed, and attend to all the matters and business that belong to the government, and that the oidores of said Audiencia do not interfere with this, and that all sign what in matters of justice is provided for, sentenced and carried out.

One further change came as part of the Bourbon Reforms of the eighteenth century. Because of  the slowness in communications between Lima and Bogotá, the Bourbons decided to establish an independent Viceroyalty of New Granada in 1717 (which was reestablished in 1739 after a short interruption). The governor-president of Bogotá became the viceroy of the new entity, with military and executive oversight over the neighboring Presidency of Quito and the provinces of Venezuela.

Administrative divisions

The New Kingdom was organized into several Governments and Provinces:

Main cities
The largest cities of the New Kingdom of Granada in the 1791 Census were
 Cartagena de Indias – 154,304
 Santa Fé de Bogotá – 108,533
 Popayan – 56,783
 Santa Marta – 49,830
 Tunja – 43,850
 Mompóx – 24,332

See also
Patria Boba
United Provinces of New Granada

Bibliography
 Avellaneda Navas, José Ignacio. The Conquerors of the New Kingdom of Granada. Albuquerque: University of New Mexico Press, 1995.
 Cook, Karoline P. "Religious Identity, Race and Status in New Granada." Race and Blood in the Iberian World; 3 (2012): 81.
Fisher, John R., Allan J. Keuthe, and Anthony McFarlane, eds. Reform and Insurrection in Bourbon New Granada and Peru. Baton Rouge: Louisiana State University Press, 1990. 
 Graff, Gary W. "Spanish Parishes in Colonial New Granada: Their Role in Town-Building on the Spanish-American Frontier." The Americas (1976): 336-351. [ in JSTOR]
 Grahn, Lance Raymond. The Political Economy of Smuggling: regional informal economies in early Bourbon New Granada. Boulder: Westview Press, 1997.
Kuethe, Allan J. Military Reform and Society in New Granada, 1773–1808. Gainesville: University Presses of Florida, 1978. 
 Markham, Clements. The Conquest of New Granada (1912) online
McFarlane, Anthony. Colombia Before Independence: Economy, Society and Politics under Bourbon Rule. Cambridge: Cambridge University Press, 1993. 
Phelan, John Leddy. The People and the King: The Comunero Revolution in Colombia, 1781. Madison: University of Wisconsin Press, 1978. 
 Ramírez, Susan Elizabeth. "Institutions of the Spanish American Empire in the Habsburg Era." in A Companion to Latin American History (2008): 106-23.
 Rodríguez Freyle, Juan. The Conquest of New Granada. London: Folio Society, 1961.

References

External links

The Educated Vassal in the State of the New Kingdom of Granada, and His Respective Duties — written 1789.

 01
Viceroyalty of Peru

Real Audiencias
Colonial Panama
Colonial Venezuela
History of Ecuador
History of Guyana
Spanish period of Trinidad and Tobago
History of South America
States and territories established in 1549
States and territories disestablished in 1739
Granada
17th century in Colombia
18th century in Colombia
Spanish colonization of the Americas
16th-century establishments in the Spanish Empire
1549 establishments in South America
1739 disestablishments in the Spanish Empire
1549 establishments in the Spanish Empire
1739 disestablishments in South America